Clayton Rogers (born November 6, 1980) is an American professional stock car racing driver. He has competed in the NASCAR Sprint Cup Series, Nationwide Series and Camping World Truck Series, and is the 2004, 2006, 2009, and 2010 champion in the USARacing Pro Cup Series.

Early career
He began racing at the age of eight in go-karts. When he was ten years old, he won his first race at Two Flags Speedway. The next season, he won his first of two championships in the World Karting Association. He then competed in the Allison Legacy Series in 1997. In 1998, Rogers began racing at Concord Motorsports Park in the NASCAR Winston Racing Series. He finished second in the overall championship standings and was named Rookie of the Year. He first competed in USAR in 2000, winning once and finishing in the top-ten eleven times. In 2006 he won one of the most prestigious short track races in the country, The Snowball Derby. Rogers returned to the USAR for 2009 and won back to back championships.

NASCAR career
Rogers made his NASCAR debut in the Busch Series in 2001. He drove the No. 17 Chevrolet Monte Carlo owned by Robbie Reiser for nine races, sharing the ride with Matt Kenseth. His best finish that season came at Memphis Motorsports Park, where he finished 12th.

After a four-year absence from NASCAR, Rogers returned to series competition in 2005 in NASCAR Craftsman Truck Series. He began in the Truck Series, driving the No. 44 Ford F-150 for Tom Baird. He made one start for Baird at Lowe's Motor Speedway, where he finished 14th. He then signed to drive the No. 65 Glynn Motorsports Dodge Ram, where he finished eighth in his first start with the team. He drove four more races for the team that season, his best finish coming in his last race at New Hampshire International Speedway, where he finished fourth.

Rogers competed in three Busch Series races in 2005 as well. He made his season debut at Bristol Motor Speedway, finishing 43rd after wrecking his No. 91 Dodge Intrepid. He completed the season driving in a pair of races for Glynn, his best finish coming at the season-ending Ford 300, where he drove the No. 58 Who's Your Daddy? Dodge to a fourteenth-place finish. After Glynn ceased operations at the end of the year, Rogers returned to USAR and won the Southern Division championship. He returned return to the Truck Series to race the No. 40 Key Motorsports truck on a part-time basis.

Rogers competed in the USAR Hooters Pro Cup in 2006, and he won the series championship.

After a 3-year absence from NASCAR Rogers returned to the Camping World Truck Series. Rogers ran the majority of the  2011 NASCAR Camping World Truck Series season in the No. 92 RBR Enterprises Chevrolet. Rogers finished a surprise 3rd in the season opening NextEra Energy Resources 250 at Daytona to Michael Waltrip and Elliott Sadler and was the points leader after Daytona, winding up finishing 20th in series points for the season.

In 2014, Rogers was possibly set to attempt to qualify for his Sprint Cup Series debut at New Hampshire driving the No. 75 Chevrolet for Beard Motorsports, but the team withdrew at the last second from the entry list. Rogers attempted to qualify at the Federated Auto Parts 400 at Richmond. However, Rogers failed to qualify. Rogers later joined BK Racing in the No. 93 for the Sylvania 300 at Loudon.  Rogers ran the 93 again at Martinsville.  He and Beard reunited at Phoenix to attempt the No. 75 a second time, but failed to qualify again.

Motorsports career results

NASCAR
(key) (Bold – Pole position awarded by qualifying time. Italics – Pole position earned by points standings or practice time. * – Most laps led.)

Sprint Cup Series

Busch Series

Camping World Truck Series

ARCA Racing Series
(key) (Bold – Pole position awarded by qualifying time. Italics – Pole position earned by points standings or practice time. * – Most laps led.)

References

External links 
 
 

Living people
1980 births
People from Mooresville, North Carolina
Racing drivers from North Carolina
NASCAR drivers
ARCA Menards Series drivers
CARS Tour drivers